The Osaka Chinese School is a Chinese international school in Naniwa-ku, Osaka, Japan. It serves grades 1-9Ú.

In 1986 Chang Hwei-chin, then the school principal, stated that every year students of the Chinese school's junior high school entered Japanese senior high schools after passing entrance examinations for admission. During the 1980s the school had experienced financial difficulties and principal Chang stated that the school had a "survival problem" in 1986.

The government of Osaka Prefecture classifies the school as a "miscellaneous school". The municipal government of Osaka allows OCS graduates who are Chinese citizens and people of Chinese descent to sit for public high school examinations, but the government has refused the same permission to OCS graduates who are Japanese citizens not of Chinese descent.

See also
Japanese international schools in Taiwan, Republic of China:
 Taipei Japanese School
 Kaohsiung Japanese School
 Taichung Japanese School

References

Further reading

 二宮 一郎. "創立53年をむかえた大阪中華学校--1999年10月10日運動会見学記." Journal of Taiwan Studies (現代台湾研究) (19), 95-104, 2000-03. 台湾史研究会. See profile at CiNii.
 "民族学校を訪ねて(2)大阪中華学校." Sai 42, 31-33, 2002. 大阪国際理解教育研究センタ-. See profile at CiNii.

External links
 / Osaka Chinese School

Elementary schools in Japan
International schools in Osaka
Taiwanese international schools in Japan